Elgin Independent School District is a public school district based in Elgin, Texas (USA).

The district is located in northern Bastrop County and extends into small portions of Travis and Lee counties.

It includes parts of Manor.

In 2009, the school district was rated "academically acceptable" by the Texas Education Agency.

Schools
In the 2012–2013 school year, the district had students in seven schools. 
High schools
Elgin High School (Grades 9-12)
Middle schools
Elgin Middle School (Grades 6-8)
Elementary schools
Booker T. Washington Elementary School (Grades K-5)
Elgin Elementary School Grades (Grades EE-5)
Neidig Elementary School (Grades K-5)
Alternative schools
Phoenix High School (Grades 9-12)
Bastrop County Juvenile Boot Camp (Grades 7-12)

References

External links 
 Elgin ISD

School districts in Bastrop County, Texas
School districts in Travis County, Texas
School districts in Lee County, Texas